Natalia Yevgenievna Pavlova (née Dongauzer, Донгаузер) is a Russian pair skating coach and former competitor for the Soviet Union.

Personal life 
Natalia Yevgenievna Dongauzer (later Pavlova) was born on 8 January 1956 in Leningrad. She is the widow of a basketball player. Their daughter, Anastasia Pavlova, was born on 30 January 1982 and also works as a skating coach.

Career 
Pavlova competed in pair skating with Vasili Blagov. The pair won the silver medal at the 1973 Prize of Moscow News.

After retiring from competition, Pavlova turned to coaching. She was based in Saint Petersburg until September 2006, when she moved to Moscow to coach at Blue Bird FSC. In 2015, she decided to return to Saint Petersburg.

Her students include:
 Evgenia Chernyshova / Dmitri Sukhanov (1989 World Junior champions).
 Marina Eltsova / Andrei Bushkov (1996 World champions). The pair joined her in 1995.
 Oksana Kazakova / Dmitri Sukhanov (Kazakova would later become the 1998 Olympic champion)
 Tatiana Totmianina / Maxim Marinin (coached from 1996–2001, would later become 2006 Olympic champions)
 Tatiana Kokoreva / Egor Golovkin (2005 World Junior bronze medalists)
 Arina Ushakova / Sergei Karev (coached during 2007–08; 2008 Russian national bronze medalists)
 Lubov Iliushechkina / Nodari Maisuradze (2009 World Junior champions), coached pair until the end of their partnership in March 2012.
 Anastasia Martiusheva / Alexei Rogonov (2009 World Junior silver medalists)

Awards 
 Master of Sports of the USSR
 Honored Coach of Russia

References 

1956 births
Living people
Soviet female single skaters
Russian figure skating coaches
Figure skaters from Saint Petersburg
Female sports coaches
Russian female pair skaters